The Winchester Hawks are a Canadian junior ice hockey team from Winchester, Ontario.  The Hawks play in the Eastern Ontario Junior Hockey League (EOJHL). Between 2014-15 and the end of the 2019-2020 seasons, the EOJHL and the CCHL set a new agreement  in an attempt to create a better player development model. This resulted in the league re-branding itself as the Central Canada Hockey League Tier 2 (CCHL2), and shrinking to 16 teams and two divisions. The league reverted to the Eastern Ontario Junior Hockey League for 2021. Prior to 2015, their league was known as the Eastern Ontario Junior Hockey League of the Ottawa District Hockey Association.

The move to become the CCHL2 marked the agreement with the Junior B league and the CCHL1 Junior A league to establish a more linear player development for the senior league teams. To that end the Winchester Hawks have promoted players to several different JrA organizations.

Season-by-season results

External links
Winchester Hawks Jr. B Hockey
CCHL2 Webpage

Eastern Ontario Junior B Hockey League teams
Ice hockey clubs established in 1971
1971 establishments in Ontario